Francesco Ferrara (1810–1900) was an Italian economist, and political scientist. He helped introduce the classical economic theories of Adam Smith, David Ricardo, and J. S. Mill into Italian scholarship. However, Ferrara was an early opponent of the Labour Theory of Value of Adam Smith, David Ricardo and James and J.S. Mill.

References

External links
 

1810 births
1900 deaths
19th-century Italian people
Finance ministers of Italy
Italian economists
Writers from Palermo
Burials at San Domenico, Palermo